A wildland water tender is a specialized vehicle capable of bringing water, foam, or dry chemicals to fire trucks in the field that are engaged on the fireline.  Water tenders have a large truck mounted tank that carries a minimum 1,000 gallons and up to 4,000 gallons of water.  These vehicles are specifically designed for fire fighting often with four-wheel drive, rugged suspension and high wheel clearance for mountainous dirt road conditions. According to the National Fire Protection Association, if the apparatus will be used primarily for outdoor and wildland responses, then it is to be considered a wildland fire apparatus and must conform to NFPA 1906. 

Support water tenders have larger water tanks and are staffed with one person. They deliver water to fire engines and large portable tanks that are connected to hose lays (hose rolled out on the ground for knocking down fires and for mop up). Tactical water tenders are capable of performing some of the functions of a wildland fire engine, such as deploying lengths of hose. Two people staff this type of water tender. Unlike support water tenders, tactical water tenders are capable of a technique of pump-and-roll. The vehicles engine can power a pump while the vehicle is being driven, so the second firefighter uses a short hose to spray water on the fire. This technique allows a team of two to flank the perimeter of a fire.

Water Tender Types
In the fall of 2007, the National Wildfire Coordinating Group agreed on a set of standards for all water tenders that are used for wildland firefighting. Water tenders are divided into support tenders and tactical tenders. 

Municipal or structural fire department also use water tenders with much larger water capacities for areas of structures that may lack fire hydrants, in case of "dry hydrants" (faulty hydrants that will not provide water flow) or in sustained cold sub-zero weather, which may freeze underground water lines. These tenders might be tractor/trailer trucks carrying 8,000 gallons or more. These water tenders might be equipped with associated fire station equipment including required number of breathing apparatus, first aid kits, telescopic ladders, heat-resisting fiberglass blankets, overall suits, electrically insulated rubber hand gloves, fireman's axes with insulated handle, fireman's helmets made of fiberglass, leather belt and pouch for axe, etc.

NFPA 1906
Additionally, there are requirements laid out by the National Fire Protection Association in NFPA 1906: Standard for Wildland Fire Apparatus. Some of the many details of the NFPA 1906 include:
Stability: All wildland apparatus must pass a 30° stability test. 
Roadability: Vehicles must be capable of operating on 20% grades and remain stationary on 10% grades.
Carrying Capacity: The Standard lays out a detailed analysis of what the allowable additional weight is on top of the gross vehicle weight rating. This is critical to keep the vehicles from getting overweight. 
Pump-And-Roll: Vehicles must be able to deliver 20 GPM at 80 psi while moving at a speed of 2 mph

References

Wildfire suppression
Trucks
Fire service vehicles